The Voigtländer Brillant is a range of pseudo-TLR cameras, and later true TLR cameras, taking 6 × 6 cm exposures on 120 film, made by Voigtländer from 1932.

Famed Hungarian-Dutch photographer Eva Besnyö used a Brillant for her early work.

Introduction
The first Voigtländer Brillant was released in 1932. This early model resembles a TLR but it is functionally closer to a box camera, since it cannot be focused in the viewfinder. It uses 'zone-focusing' for which one has to estimate the distance to the subject. To assist this estimate, three situations are marked around the taking lens: Porträt, Gruppe and Landschaft (i. e. Portrait, Group and Landscape). While TLRs of the same period have a rather dim ground-glass viewfinder, the Brillant has a so-called brilliant finder made of plain glass.

The 1932 version has a metal body. From 1937 onwards, Brillants were made of bakelite, a polymer, and introduced an accessory compartment for an exposure meter or filters. This 1937 version is known as the Brillant V6.

The next major step took place in 1938, with the introduction of the Focusing Brillant. A small opaque spot is added in the brilliant finder to focus on. The viewing and taking lens are coupled outside the body through gears. After the introduction of this focusing model, the zone-focusing models continued to be produced.

Focusing and controls
Pre-1938 models use zone focusing. This means there are three markings: Portrait, Group and Landscape, each supposing a standard distance or depth-of-field. A small table with the right distances is provided in the manual or inside the accessory-shoe holder. Different language versions were made for various markets; German, English (their name became Brilliant), Spanish, French, Italian, Polish and Czechoslovak versions have been reported. Apart from this zone-focusing, a distance scale in meters or feet and a depth-of-field scale are provided to let the photographer make an educated guess of whether the picture will be in focus. Three shutter speeds are provided; B, 1/25 and 1/50s. The aperture can be set at 9 (full aperture), 11 and 22. The latter two are selected by rotating a punched disc between the lenses.

The introduction of the Focusing Brillant added a third way of focusing: a visual focus check on a small dot of ground glass in the viewfinder.

Variations
Early models have a metal body, later models are made of bakelite. Most models have a swing door for accessories; some have a rotating accessory door.
Aperture, lens and shutter may vary from type to type and in time.
The Soviet camera factory GOMZ/LOMO made Komsomolets and Lubitel cameras that were clearly based on the Voigtländer Brillant.

References

External links
VOIGTLANDER BRILLIANT V6

German cameras
Brillant
120 film cameras